3D audio effects are a group of sound effects that manipulate the sound produced by stereo speakers, surround-sound speakers, speaker-arrays, or headphones. This frequently involves the virtual placement of sound sources anywhere in three-dimensional space, including behind, above or below the listener.

3-D audio (processing) is the spatial domain convolution of sound waves using Head-related transfer functions. It is the phenomenon of transforming sound waves (using head-related transfer function or HRTF filters and cross talk cancellation techniques) to mimic natural sounds waves, which emanate from a point in a 3-D space. It allows trickery of the brain using the ears and auditory nerves, pretending to place different sounds in different 3-D locations upon hearing the sounds, even though the sounds may just be produced from just 2 speakers (dissimilar to surround sound).

Complete 3D positional audio

Using head-related transfer functions and reverberation, the changes of sound on its way from the source (including reflections from walls and floors) to the listener's ear can be simulated. These effects include localization of sound sources behind, above and below the listener.

Some 3D technologies also convert binaural recordings to stereo recordings. MorrowSoundTrue3D converts binaural, stereo, 5.1 and other formats to 8.1 single and multiple zone 3D sound experiences in realtime.

3D Positional Audio effects emerged in the 1990s in PC and Game Consoles.

3D audio techniques have also been incorporated in music and video-game style music video arts. The Audioscape research project, provides musicians with a real-time 3D audiovisual content authoring and rendering environment, suitable for live performance applications.

True representation of the elevation level for 3D loudspeaker reproduction become possible by the Ambisonics and wave field synthesis (WFS) principle.

3-D audio presentations
Some amusement parks have created attractions based around the principles of 3-D audio.  One example is Sounds Dangerous! at Disney's Hollywood Studios at the Walt Disney World Resort in Florida.  Guests wear special earphones as they watch a short film starring comedian Drew Carey.  At a point in the film, the screen goes dark while a 3-D audio sound-track immerses the guests in the ongoing story.  To ensure that the effect is heard properly, the earphone covers are color-coded to indicate how they should be worn.  This is not a generated effect but a binaural recording.

MorrowSoundTrue3D soundscapes include Torino Winter Olympics, ProFootball Hall of Fame, Great Lakes Children's Museum, NokiaWorld 2008 Barcelona, Denver Museum Nature and Science Gates Planetarium, New York Historical Society, Copenhagen International Theatre, Gallery Rachel Haferkamp Köln, Muu Gallery Helsinki, New Sounds New York, ZHDK Zurich, OKKO Design Stockholm, BAFTA Awards London, Collection of Diana Zlotnick Studio City, CA, as well as Ecsite, AAM, ASTC and IPS conventions. These range from single 8.1 to 64.3 True3D installations, some interactive.

Nick Cave's novel The Death of Bunny Munro was recorded in audiobook format using 3D audio.

The song "Propeller Seeds" by English artist Imogen Heap was recorded using 3D audio.

There has been developments in using 3D audio for DJ performances including the world's first Dolby Atmos event on 23rd Jan 2016 held at Ministry of Sound, London. The event was a showcase of a 3D audio DJ set performed by Hospital Records owner Tony Colman aka London Elektricity.

Other investigations included the Jago 3D Sound project which is looking at using Ambisonics combined with STEM music containers created and released by Native Instruments in 2015 for 3D nightclub sets.

See also

References

External links
The 3D Audio and Applied Acoustics (3D3A) Laboratory at Princeton University

Audio effects
Auditory illusions